The 2018 Ohio Valley Conference women's soccer tournament was the postseason women's soccer tournament for the Ohio Valley Conference held from October 26 through November 4, 2018. The first round and quarterfinals of the tournament were held at campus sites hosted by the #3 and #4 seeds, while the semifinals and final took place at Skyhawk Soccer Field in Martin, Tennessee. The eight-team single-elimination tournament consisted of four rounds based on seeding from regular season conference play. The Murray State Racers were the defending champions and successfully defended their title with a 2–1 win over the Tennessee-Martin Skyhawks in the final. The conference tournament title was the fourth for the Murray State women's soccer program and the third for head coach Jeremy Groves.

Bracket

Source:

Schedule

First Round

Quarterfinals

Semifinals

Final

Statistics

Goalscorers 
2 Goals
 Kaci Mitchell – UT Martin
 Miyah Watford – Murray State

1 Goal
 Bailly Bounds – Eastern Kentucky
 Andrea Frerker – SIUE
 Esmie Gonzales – Southeast Missouri
 Angel Ikeda – SIUE
 Samantha Kelly – UT Martin
 Rebecca Kubin – Murray State
 Amy McGivern – UT Martin
 Katie Quinn – Morehead St.
 Monica Rios – Eastern Kentucky
 Kayla Stolfa – Eastern Illinois

All-Tournament team

Source:

References

External links

Ohio Valley Conference Women's Soccer Tournament
2018 Ohio Valley Conference women's soccer season